Mike Monroe may refer to:

Mike Monroe, a character in the 1952 film Because of You
Mike Monroe, a fictional character in Northern Exposure
Michael Monroe (born 1962), musician, member of Hanoi Rocks
Michael Monroe, protagonist in the novel SOS Adventures

See also
Mike Munro, Australian TV presenter